Yendovishche is a rural locality (a selo) in Semilukskoye Rural Settlement, Semiluksky District, Voronezh Oblast, Russia. The population was 1,933 as of 2010. There are 16 streets.

Geography 
Yendovishche is located 8 km north of Semiluki (the district's administrative centre) by road. Semiluki is the nearest rural locality.

References 

Rural localities in Semiluksky District